Lentinellus is a genus of white rot, wood decay, lamellate agaric in the family Auriscalpiaceae, further characterized in part by rough-walled, amyloid spores produced on lamellae with jagged edges.  Typically, thick-walled hyphae in the fruit body are in part amyloid, and frequently the taste of the mushrooms is acrid (burning, spicy). The widespread genus has been estimated to contain 15 species. Mycologists Ronald Petersen and Karen Hughes considered 24 species in their 2004 world monograph of the genus.

Classification and naming
The name Lentinellus is the diminutive of Lentinus, which is the generic name for another group of wood-decay fungi with rough lamellar edges.  The type species and the best-known is L. cochleatus, which was classified under Lentinus by Persoon in 1825.  Later it was realized that the species now in Lentinellus are very different in other characteristics from the other Lentinus species, and in modern taxonomy the groups are put into different orders (Lentinus is in Polyporales whereas Lentinellus is in Russulales).

Closely allied genera are Auriscalpium and Dentipratulum, with Artomyces slightly more distantly related.  These groups are non-agaricoid but, strangely enough, Lentinellus is more closely related to them than to other gilled mushrooms.

Inedibility
All species in the genus are inedible due to their bitter taste.

Species

References

External links
 Photo of Lentinellus ursinus.
 Photos of Lentinellus species.
 Photo of Lentinellus castoreus.

Russulales
Russulales genera